Carlow is a municipality in the Nordwestmecklenburg district, in Mecklenburg-Vorpommern, Germany. It includes the quarters (German: Ortsteil) of Klein Molzahn, Klocksdorf, Kuhlrade, Neschow, Pogez, Samkow and Stove.

References

External links 

Nordwestmecklenburg
Grand Duchy of Mecklenburg-Strelitz